Michael Charles Chiklis ( born August 30, 1963) is an American actor, television director, television producer and musician. He is best known for his role as Los Angeles Police Department (LAPD) Detective Vic Mackey on the FX police drama The Shield (2002–2008), for which he won the Primetime Emmy Award for Outstanding Lead Actor in a Drama Series in 2002, and was nominated in 2003. Other starring television roles of his include Commissioner Tony Scali on the ABC police drama The Commish (1991–1996), Chris Woods in Daddio (2000), Jim Powell on the ABC science-fiction comedy-drama No Ordinary Family (2010–2011),  Vincent Savino in the CBS crime drama Vegas (2012), Dell Toledo in American Horror Story: Freak Show (2014), and Nathaniel Barnes in Gotham (2015–2017). In film, he is best known for his roles as The Thing in two Fantastic Four films (2005–2007), George Callister in Eagle Eye (2008), Terry Eidson in When the Game Stands Tall (2014), and Father Dave in Hubie Halloween (2020).

Early life
Chiklis was born in Lowell, Massachusetts. His mother, Katherine (née Vousboukis), is a hospital administrative aide, and his father, Charlie Chiklis, runs a hair/beauty salon. Chiklis has been described as having inherited his acting ability from his mother. His father is a second-generation Greek American (his paternal ancestors came from Lesbos), and his mother is of Greek and Irish descent. Chiklis grew up in Andover, Massachusetts and began entertaining his family with celebrity imitations when he was 5 years old. As a child, Chiklis appeared in regional theater productions and became a member of the Actors' Equity Association at age 13. In the ninth grade, he portrayed Hawkeye Pierce in Andover High School's production of M*A*S*H. He graduated from Boston University College of Fine Arts with a Bachelor of Fine Arts.

Career
After graduating from college, Chiklis moved to Brooklyn, New York and was cast in the role of John Belushi in the controversial biopic Wired (1989). The film was panned in general and flopped at the box office, though Chiklis's performance as Belushi (one of his idols) was highly praised. He also guest starred in several popular television series such as Miami Vice, B.L. Stryker, Wiseguy, L.A. Law, Murphy Brown, and Seinfeld, as well as in bit parts in such films as Nixon.

Chiklis' first successful role was in The Commish, a police comedy/drama that ran from 1991 to 1996 on ABC. Chiklis played Anthony "Tony" J. Scali, a police commissioner in a small city in upstate New York. After The Commish, Chiklis starred in the short-lived NBC sitcom Daddio.

In 1997, Chiklis replaced Rob Becker in the Broadway one-man show Defending the Caveman, taking on the role from January 1997 to the show's closing in June 1997.

After playing Curly Howard in the TV film The Three Stooges (2000), Chiklis decided to reinvent his image. With his wife's help, he spent six months on an extensive workout regimen and shaved his head. He turned up to audition for The Shield looking nothing like the pudgy, friendly character of The Commish. Chiklis won over creator Shawn Ryan and nabbed the leading role of the show's anti-hero, LAPD Detective Vic Mackey. He won the 2002 Emmy Award for Outstanding Lead Actor In A Drama Series for the role. Chiklis received a Golden Globe Award that same year for Best Performance by an Actor in a Television Series-Drama as well. Between 2004 and 2005, he was nominated for a Golden Globe for Best Actor in a Drama Series but did not win. Chiklis later parodied his role as Vic Mackey in the Robot Chicken episode, "Monstourage"; the skit involved Mackey's accidentally switching places with Ben Grimm.

Since 2000, Chiklis has taken up a number of voice roles, voicing Chihiro's father, Akio, in the English dub of Hayao Miyazaki's Spirited Away and Roman/King Webster in the direct-to-video feature The Adventures of Tom Thumb and Thumbelina. He has also performed in several episodes of Family Guy and had a voice role in Heavy Gear: The Animated Series.

In 2005, he starred in Fantastic Four (2005) as Thing and reprised the role in its sequel, Fantastic Four: Rise of the Silver Surfer (2007). A fan of the comic book series, he had dreamed of playing the character if ever a Fantastic Four film were produced. Chiklis was often praised for his performance in a film that otherwise earned mixed reviews. His wife visited him on set during the filming but was unaware that he would be in his full bodysuit and makeup as The Thing; she was totally unprepared to see him like that, found it distressing, and had to be guided from the set to collect herself.

In the film Eagle Eye (2008), Chiklis portrays the United States Secretary of Defense.

In the wake of the Bernie Madoff scandal, Chiklis is developing a series at FX about a similar investment scheme. The project, called House of Cards, concerns a group committing an elaborate scam similar to the Madoff fraud. Chiklis had been developing the project since February 2008 after he and his wife became victims of a Ponzi scheme themselves. Cards will likely center on the leader of the scheme, with Chiklis planning to executive produce but not star.

Chiklis later starred in the ABC television series No Ordinary Family, which premiered on September 28, 2010, as part of the 2010–11 television season and ended in April, 2011. He also co-starred in the CBS Crime drama Vegas.

In March 2014, it was announced that Chiklis had been cast in American Horror Story: Freak Show, season 4 of the FX anthology series.

In 2014, Chiklis played a small part towards the end of the FX series Sons of Anarchy. He appears first in the episode "Rose Red", as a trucker who first encounters Gemma, who is on her way to her father, at a truck stop. He also plays a truck driver in the series finale.

In 2015, he appeared in Gotham as Captain Nathaniel Barnes. In a nod to Chiklis' time on the Strike Team on The Shield, his character established a similarly named "Strike Force".

In September 2016, Chiklis released his first solo album, INFLUENCE. He wrote and produced the album at his own Extravaganza Music Studio.

Personal life
Chiklis married Michelle Epstein on June 21, 1992, and they have two daughters: Autumn, born on October 9, 1993, and Odessa, born on March 26, 1999. Autumn played Vic Mackey's daughter Cassidy on The Shield.

A lifelong comic book fan, Chiklis rarely turns down an autograph request from children. According to the DVD commentary for the Fantastic Four film, he has become hoarse from performing The Thing's voice so many times.

Chiklis is a fan of both the Boston Red Sox and the Boston Bruins, was interviewed for the HBO documentary the Curse of the Bambino about the Red Sox's long struggle to win the World Series, and narrated the video introduction of the New England Patriots in Super Bowl XXXIX.

Chiklis is also an accomplished musician, specializing in drums and vocals, but also playing guitar and bass. He is a member of several performing bands in the Boston area such as The Surgeon General, Best Kept Secret, and Double Talk. He has starred in and produced films through his own production company, Extravaganza.

In 2011, Chiklis and his band MCB released their first single "Til I Come Home", a tribute song to the soldiers overseas. The song has been critically acclaimed worldwide and was used in his TV series No Ordinary Family in 2011. MCB's prior music includes another single, "Make Me High", written for the independent film High School (2010), starring Chiklis, Adrien Brody, Colin Hanks, and Matt Bush; the single was released in spring 2011.

Following his stint on American Horror Story: Freak Show, Chiklis told Larry King that he did not enjoy working on the show: "That was one of the darkest years of my career. It was, I think, it's one thing to do a horror film in the context of like two months or something like that, but to live in that for six months it just became, I don't know. Maybe it's because I'm an empathetic person, and I just sometimes start to take things on. But it was so dark, and it was so nasty."

On the January 12, 2021, episode of The Talk, Chiklis revealed his passion for the martial arts, and stated that he had recently attained the rank of yellow belt in karate.

Philanthropy
Chiklis has participated in celebrity Texas hold 'em tournaments to benefit comedian Brad Garrett's charity foundation, Maximum Hope. Chiklis has worked closely with many different charities over the years including The Children's Lifesaving Foundation, Alzheimer's Association, Autism Speaks and the Revlon Run Walk.

Filmography

Film

Television

Video games

Theater

Awards and nominations

References in popular culture
The web series Jake and Amir often made reference to Chiklis in the phrase "going dickless for Michael Chiklis", which involves a person tucking their penis between their legs, ostensibly for Michael Chiklis.

References

External links

 
 

1963 births
20th-century American male actors
21st-century American male actors
Actors from Lowell, Massachusetts
American male film actors
American people of Greek descent
American people of Irish descent
American male stage actors
American male television actors
American male video game actors
American male voice actors
Television producers from Massachusetts
Best Drama Actor Golden Globe (television) winners
Boston University College of Fine Arts alumni
Living people
Male actors from Massachusetts
Outstanding Performance by a Lead Actor in a Drama Series Primetime Emmy Award winners
People from Andover, Massachusetts